The Omnibus Clause of 18 U.S.C. §1503, or Omnibus Provision, provides that anyone who corruptly... obstructs or impedes, or endeavors to influence, obstruct or impede, the due administration of justice", is guilty of the crime of obstruction of justice.

References

Deception
Criminal procedure
United States federal legislation